Stella Manuela Juliana Calloni Leguizamón (born 19 June 1935) is an Argentine journalist and writer specializing in international politics, whose investigative work focuses on Latin American military dictatorships and related political processes. Her books Los años del lobo: la Operación Cóndor (1999) and Operación Cóndor, pacto criminal (2006) gather parts of her research into the campaign known as Operation Condor.

Biography
Stella Calloni was born on 19 June 1935 in the small town of Pueblo Leguizamón, in La Paz Department, Entre Ríos Province. She attended school in her home province and then moved to Buenos Aires to complete her education. There she linked up with left-wing militants and intellectuals such as Zelmar Michelini, and Miguel Ángel Asturias, and began to write for magazines such as Política Internacional and Cristianismo y revolución.

She started covering international news stories during the 1970 Chilean presidential election. During the civic-military dictatorship that ruled Argentina from 1976 to 1983, she went into exile in Mexico and Panama. In those years she worked as editor of the magazine Formato Dieciséis, and as a screenwriter for the University of Panama's University Film Experimental Group.

She is a contributor to the Voltaire Network, created at the initiative of Thierry Meyssan, editor of El Día Latinoamericano, and a South American correspondent for La Jornada, both based in Mexico City.

Throughout her professional career, she has interviewed numerous heads of state, such as Fidel Castro, Hugo Chávez, Evo Morales, Luiz Inácio Lula da Silva, Rafael Correa, Daniel Ortega, Salvador Allende, Omar Torrijos, Jimmy Carter, Yasser Arafat, Muammar Gaddafi, and Felipe González.

Awards and recognition
 José Martí Latin American Journalism Award (1986)
  Journalism School Award (2003)
 Félix Elmuza Distinction from the Union of Journalists of Cuba (2006)
  (2008)
 Rodolfo Walsh Award from the National University of La Plata (2012)
 Outstanding Personality in the Field of Human Rights from the Buenos Aires City Legislature
 Cultural Ambassador ad honorem by disposition of the Governor of Entre Ríos (2014)

In 2013, the journalists Julio Ferrer and Héctor Bernardo published a biographical narrative of Fidel Castro, assembled from a series of interviews with Stella Calloni, with a preface by Castro himself.

In 2022, she was honored by the Periodistas Argentinas collective, along with 14 other media professionals, as a role model and inspiration. This recognition was presented on 8 March, within the framework of International Women's Day.

Selected publications
 
 
  Co-authored with Rafael Cribari.
 
 
 
  Poetry.
  Prologue by Adolfo Pérez Esquivel.
 
  Co-authored with Víctor Ego Ducrot.
  Translated into German in 2010 with the title Operación Cóndor: Lateinamerika im Griff der Todesschwadronen.
  Co-authored with Xavier Goikolea Ameraun.
 . Poetry. 1st edition c. 1976.
  Prologue by Adolfo Pérez Esquivel.
  Co-authored with Baltasar Garzón and Grègoire Champenois.
  Interviews with Gloria Gaitán, Fanny Edelman, Gladys Marín, Danielle Mitterrand, Nélida Piñon,  Rigoberta Menchú, Sarah Méndez, and Olga Orozco. Biographical stories about Manuela Sáenz, Frida Kahlo, and Rosario Castellanos.
  Poetry.

References

External links
 Stella Calloni at Voltaire Network

1935 births
21st-century Argentine women writers
21st-century Argentine poets
Argentine journalists
Argentine women journalists
Argentine women poets
Investigative journalists
Living people
People from Entre Ríos Province